Huan Donald John Fraser (16 February 1940 – 18 February 2010) was an Australian politician.

A Paroo Shire Councillor and former Deputy Mayor of Logan City, Fraser was elected to the Legislative Assembly of Queensland in 1986 as the National Party's member for Springwood, although he was motivated more by local concerns than by Premier Joh Bjelke-Petersen's leadership. When Russell Cooper became Premier of Queensland in September 1989 he appointed Fraser Minister for Industry, Small Business and Technology, but at the election later that year the government was defeated and Fraser lost his seat.

References

1940 births
2010 deaths
National Party of Australia members of the Parliament of Queensland
Members of the Queensland Legislative Assembly
Queensland local councillors